The Delhi–Pathankot Superfast Express is an Express train belonging to Northern Railway zone that runs between  and  in India. It is currently being operated with 22429/22430 train numbers on six days in a week basis.

Service

The 22429/Delhi–Pathankot Superfast Express has an average speed of 55 km/hr and covers 554 km in 10h 5m. The 22430/Pathankot–Delhi Superfast Express has an average speed of 55 km/hr and covers 554 km in 10h 5m.

Schedule

Route and stops 

The important stops of the train are:

 
 
 
 
 
 
 
 
 
Amritsar Junction
 
 
 
Dinanagar

Coach composition

The train has standard ICF rakes with a maximum speed of 110 kmph. The train consists of 16 coaches:

 1 AC Chair Car
 10 Chair Car
 3 General Unreserved
 2 Seating cum Luggage Rake

Traction

Both trains are hauled by a Ghaziabad Loco Shed-based WAP-5 electric locomotive from Old Delhi to Pathankot and in return also.

Direction reversal

The train reverses its direction once:

See also 

 Old Delhi railway station
 Pathankot Junction railway station
 Dhauladhar Express

Notes

References

External links 

 22429/Delhi - Pathankot Superfast Express
 22430/Pathankot - Delhi Superfast Express

Transport in Delhi
Transport in Pathankot
Express trains in India
Rail transport in Delhi
Rail transport in Haryana
Rail transport in Punjab, India